The 2017–18 Swiss Cup is the 93rd season of Switzerland's annual football cup competition. The competition started on 12 August 2017 with the first games of Round 1 and ended on 27 May 2018 with the final. FC Basel were the defending champions, but were eliminated in the semi-finals by BSC Young Boys.

Participating clubs
All teams from 2015–16 Super League and 2015–16 Challenge League as well as the top 4 teams from 2016–17 Promotion League automatically entered this year's competition. The remaining 41 teams had to qualify through separate qualifying rounds within their leagues. Reserve teams and teams from Liechtenstein are not allowed in the competition, the latter only enter the 2017–18 Liechtenstein Cup.

Teams in bold are still active in the competition.

TH Title holders.

Round 1
Teams from Super League and Challenge League were seeded in this round. In a match, the home advantage was granted to the team from the lower league, if applicable. Teams in bold continue to the next round of the competition.

|-
| colspan="3" style="background:#9cc;"|12 August 2017

|-
| colspan="3" style="background:#9cc;"|13 August 2017

|}

Source: Swiss Football Association

Round 2

|-
| colspan="3" style="background:#9cc;"|15 September 2017

|-
| colspan="3" style="background:#9cc;"|16 September 2017

|-
| colspan="3" style="background:#9cc;"|17 September 2017

|}

Source: Swiss Football Association

Round 3

|-
| colspan="3" style="background:#9cc;"|24 October 2017

|-
| colspan="3" style="background:#9cc;"|25 October 2017

|-
| colspan="3" style="background:#9cc;"|26 October 2017

|}

Source: Swiss Football Association

Quarter-finals
The matches were played on 29 and 30 November 2017.

Semi-finals 
The winners of Quarter finals play in the Semi finals, there is no home advantage granted in the draw. Matches will be played on 27 and 28 February 2018.

Final 
The winners of the semifinals play in the Final. The match will be played on 27 May 2018 at the Stade de Suisse in Bern.

References

External links
 Official site 
 Official site 
 Official site 

Swiss Cup seasons
Swiss Cup
Cup